The Survivors' Suite is an album by jazz pianist Keith Jarrett featuring his 'American Quartet' ensemble which included Dewey Redman, Charlie Haden, and Paul Motian. It represents the first album they recorded for ECM and in terms of music it has been widely considered to find the group at its pinnacle. Initially published in January 1977, vinyl was reissued in April 2017 as audiophile pressing taken from the original analog tapes.

Original notes 
In the original ECM 1085 vinyl and CD issues this quote can be found (no author stated, possibly by Keith Jarrett):

Conception and composition
Regarding sound, venues, composition and orchestration, in a February 2009 interview conducted by Stuart Nicholson, Keith Jarrett stated that:

Critical reception 
According to some sources, it was voted Jazz Album of the Year 1978 by the extinct Melody Maker. In their review, it was noted that "The Survivors' Suite is a brilliantly organized and full-blooded work which provides the perfect setting for all four talents. This is a very complete record. It creates its own universe and explores it thoroughly, leaving the listener awed and satisfied... An unashamedly ardent album, Jarrett’s very finest."

Writing for the now defunct jazz magazine Jazz.com, Ted Gioia rated 97/100 the whole The Survivors' Suite:

The Allmusic review by Stacia Proefrock awarded the album 5 stars, stating, "Like other albums of its time, this was beginning to show the brightness, lightness, and soft edges of contemporary jazz, but the solidness of Haden's bass helps the music rooted and earthbound.".

The Penguin Guide to Jazz by Richard Cook and Brian Morton regards the album as a "masterpiece, with the quartet pulling together on an ambitiously large-scale piece, each member contributing whole-heartedly and passionately."

Track listing
All music composed by Keith Jarrett.
 "The Survivors' Suite: Beginning" - 27:21
 "The Survivors' Suite: Conclusion' - 21:18

Personnel 
 Keith Jarrett - piano, soprano saxophone, recorder, celeste, osi drums
 Dewey Redman - tenor saxophone, percussion
 Charlie Haden - double-bass
 Paul Motian - drums, percussion

Production
 Manfred Eicher - producer
 Martin Wieland - recording engineer
 Barbara Wojirsch  - layout
 Keith Jarrett - cover photography

References 

Keith Jarrett albums
1977 albums
ECM Records albums
Albums produced by Manfred Eicher